The 1983 Virginia Slims of Indianapolis was a women's tennis tournament played on indoor carpet courts in Indianapolis, Indiana in the United States that was part of the Ginny Tournament Circuit of the 1983 Virginia Slims World Championship Series. It was the third edition of the tournament and was held from February 7 through February 14, 1983. Anne Hobbs won the singles title.

Finals

Singles

 Anne Hobbs defeated  Ginny Purdy 6–4, 6–7, 6–4
 It was Hobbs' 1st title of the year and the 2nd of her career.

Doubles

 Lea Antonoplis /  Barbara Jordan defeated  Rosalyn Fairbank /  Candy Reynolds 5–7, 6–4, 7–5
 It was Antonoplis' only title of the year and the 1st of her career. It was Jordan's 1st title of the year and the 7th of her career.

Notes

References

Virginia Slims of Indianapolis
Virginia Slims of Indianapolis
Virginia Slims of Indianapolis
Virginia Slims of Indianapolis
Virginia Slims of Indianapolis